Paweł Śpiewak (born 17 April 1951) is the Director of the Jewish Historical Institute in Warsaw, Poland.  He is a sociologist, historian, author and former politician.

History

Paweł Śpiewak is a Professor of Sociology at Warsaw University.  He was elected to the Sejm on September 25, 2005 getting 18,403 votes in 19 Warsaw district, running as a candidate with the Civic Platform list.  He did not seek reelection in 2007.

He is a Fellow of Collegium Invisibile.

In 2011, he was nominated as the Director of the Jewish Historical Institute by Bogdan Zdrojewski, Minister of Culture and National Heritage.

He is a son of nationally renowned writers Anna Kamieńska (1920-1986) and Jan Śpiewak (1908-1967).

See also
Members of Polish Sejm 2005-2007

References

External links
Paweł Śpiewak - parliamentary page - includes declarations of interest, voting record, and transcripts of speeches.

1951 births
Living people
Members of the Polish Sejm 2005–2007
Civic Platform politicians
20th-century Polish Jews
21st-century Polish Jews
Polish sociologists
Academic staff of the University of Warsaw
Fellows of Collegium Invisibile